Setumong is a large village in the Polokwane Local Municipality of the Capricorn District Municipality in the Limpopo province of South Africa. It is the capital of the Ga-Matlala tribal chieftaincy and headquarters the Bakone Traditional Council. It located about 48 km northwest of the city of Polokwane on the Matlala Road.

Tradition
Setumong is an important center of tradition and culture in Ga-Matlala and the Aganang Local Municipality. The majority of the villages in the municipality belong to the Bakone Traditional Council; which, along with the traditional councils of Moletši and Ga-Mašašane, make up the municipal body of traditional affairs.

Education
Sekgwari Primary School.
Bakone Primary School.
BK Matlala Secondary School.

Notable people
Kgoši Mokgama Maurice Matlala - Chief Minister of the Bantustan of Lebowa from 1972-1973.
Kgošigadi Mmakwena Matlala - Anti-Apartheid Chieftainess of Ga-Matlala.

References

Populated places in the Polokwane Local Municipality